Auterive is the name of the following communes in France:

 Auterive, Haute-Garonne, in the Haute-Garonne department
 Auterive, Gers, in the Gers department
 Auterive, Tarn-et-Garonne, in the Tarn-et-Garonne department